Janetta Isabel Mary Ornsby (1871-1954) was a British suffragist and one of the founder's of the Women's Engineering Society.

Early life 
Born Janet Isabel Mary Palmer, her parents were Reverend Albert Reynolds Palmer of Dalkieth and Margaret Anne Macfarlane (1839-93). She was the granddaughter of Dr MacFarlane, also of Dalkieth and had three siblings, Ethel who undertook medical training at the University of Edinburgh, Charles (an architect) and Brien (a minister in Australia).

Marriage 
In 1896, Janet Palmer married Robert Embleton Ornsby (1856-1920), agent to the Seaton Delaval Coal Company and author of the memoirs of James Robert Hope Scott in 1884. Due to her husband's ill health, she often addressed coalminers and coal owners in his absence.

Women's Engineering Society 
Janet Ornsby was involved in the women's suffrage movement and was one of the seven signatories on the founding documents for the Women's Engineering Society in 1919, alongside Lady Katharine Parsons, her daughter Rachel Parsons, Lady Margaret Moir, Laura Annie Willson, Eleanor Shelley-Rolls and Margaret Rowbotham. She was elected to the WES Council at the first AGM on 19th May 1920. 

She died in Edinburgh in 1954.

References

1871 births
1954 deaths
British suffragists
People from Northumberland
British engineers
Women's Engineering Society